Katsunari Mizumoto (水本勝成 | born February 19, 1990) is a Japanese football player for Kagoshima United FC.

Club statistics
Updated to 23 February 2018.

References

External links

Profile at Kagoshima United FC

1990 births
Living people
Association football people from Kumamoto Prefecture
Japanese footballers
J2 League players
J3 League players
Japan Football League players
Gainare Tottori players
Kagoshima United FC players
Association football defenders